was a Japanese samurai of the Sengoku period through early Edo period, who served the Tokugawa clan; he later became a daimyō.

Nobunari is believed to have been the illegitimate son of Matsudaira Hirotada (which would make him the half-brother of Tokugawa Ieyasu). He was later adopted by Naitō Kiyonaga. As the years passed on with his brother's succession to headship and the birth of the Tokugawa, Nobunari primarily acted as the former's page, but ascended to a greater means of ranking after supporting in the 1565 assault against Mikawa monk rioters. After distinguishing himself in battle during a certain assault upon Kuroma castle at a later time, Nobunari went on to respectively support the Tokugawa within the Battle of Mikatagahara in 1573, and Nagashino of 1575, where he showed at least moderate ability on both battlefields. By the year of 1590, Nobunari would be awarded Nirayama Castle of Izu Province—respectively holding 10,000 koku to its name—and would enter into the Edo period with a 50,000 koku fief at Nagahama within Ōmi Province, where he remained as daimyō until he died in 1612.

Family
 Father: Matsudaira Hirotada
 Mother: Naito no Tsubone
 Wife: Awao Nagakatsu's daughter
 Children:
 Naito Nobumasa (1568-1626)
 Naito Nobuhiro (d.1619)
 Naito Nobusuke

References
 "Naitō" on Murakami daijiten (22 February 2008)
 "Naitō Nobunari" (22 February 2008)

Naitō clan
Samurai
1545 births
1612 deaths
Japanese pages
Daimyo